Yalding House is a building at 152–156 Great Portland Street, London, United Kingdom. It was formerly owned by the British Broadcasting Corporation (BBC), and from 1952 until 2013 housed the corporation's music department.

The BBC Central Music Library was located on the ground floor and basement: the building's former role as a car showroom made it ideal for the heavy shelving required to store the collection. The BBC Third Programme, later renamed Radio 3, was also based at Yalding House.

It became the home of BBC Radio 1, together with Newsbeat, in 1996 when the Radio 1 studios were moved from Egton House. BBC Radio 1Xtra was launched at Yalding House.

On 14 December 2012, Radio 1 broadcast its last show from Yalding House which was The Radio 1 Breakfast Show with Nick Grimshaw.

Studios
Yalding House contained five studios which were used to broadcast shows on Radio 1 and 1Xtra.
Studio Y1 - used mainly for production.
Studio Y2 - used by The Radio 1 Breakfast Show with Nick Grimshaw, The Official Chart with Reggie Yates, Scott Mills and Greg James.
Studio Y3 - used by Fearne Cotton, Zane Lowe and Huw Stephens.
Studios Y4&Y5 - used mainly by 1Xtra, but occasionally by Radio 1, as needed.

References

External links 
 Egton House and Yalding House information at Radio Rewind

BBC offices, studios and buildings
BBC Radio 1
Buildings and structures in the City of Westminster